Nabilah Naggayi Sempala is a Ugandan politician. She is the incumbent Member of Parliament representing the Kampala Women Parliamentary Constituency in the 10th Ugandan Parliament (2016 to 2021).

Background and education
Nabilah Naggayi was born in Uganda in April 1972. She attended Kibuli Demonstration School for her primary education before she transferred to Kibuli Secondary School for her O-Level studies. She then completed her A-Level education at Mengo Senior School, graduating from there with a High School Diploma in 1992.

In 1994, Naggayi graduated with a Diploma in Translation from Saarland University, in Saarbrücken, Germany. In 1996, she went off to obtain a Bachelor of Arts degree from Makerere University, the oldest and largest public university in Uganda. Her degree of Master of Arts in Public Administration, was awarded by Makerere University in 2011.

Career
Naggayi began her political career as a Councilor in  Wakiso District Local Government in 2001, serving in that capacity until 2005. She, with others, including Muhammad Nsereko, the incumbent member of Parliament for Kampala Central Division, established the Social Democratic Party (SDP). She actively campaigned for the re-opening of the political space to multi-party democracy during the 2005 referendum. It was not until the run-up to the 2006 general elections, that she formally joined the Forum for Democratic Change (FDC) political party.

In 2006, at the age of 35, she unseated Margaret Nantongo Zziwa of the National Resistance Movement (NRM) political party, to capture the Women Representative's seat for Kampala in the 8th parliament (2006 to 2011).

During the 2011 parliamentary elections, she received 222,724 votes compared to the 164,378 votes her closest challenger, Margaret Zziwa of the NRM received. During 2013, a group of lawyers sued her, the Attorney General of Uganda and the Electoral Commission of Uganda, on a technicality, since the Central Government of Uganda had taken over the management of Kampala on 28 December 2010, and the city had ceased to be regarded as a district.

In 2016 Naggayi faced off with five other contestants, including the incumbent Minister of State for Youth and Children's Affairs, Florence Nakiwala Kiyingi. However Naggayi won handily. During the debate to remove presidential age limits from the Uganda Constitution, Naggayi was one of the opposition members of parliament who were forcibly removed from the house chamber by security forces, on 27 September 2017, although she had not been suspended by the Speaker.

She stood for the position of Lord Mayor for the 2021-2026 elections and lost to Erias Lukwago.

See also
 Forum for Democratic Change
 Kampala Capital City Authority

References

External links
Website of the Parliament of Uganda
Nabilah Naggayi Sempala highlights some of her achievements
FDC Dismayed As Nabilah Spills Party Rot on Facebook

Living people
1971 births
Ganda people
Members of the Parliament of Uganda
21st-century Ugandan women politicians
21st-century Ugandan politicians
Women members of the Parliament of Uganda
People from Kampala
Saarland University alumni
Forum for Democratic Change politicians
People from Central Region, Uganda
Makerere University alumni